The 1954 Ottawa Rough Riders finished in 4th place in the IRFU with a 2–12 record and failed to qualify for the playoffs.

Preseason

Regular season

Standings

Schedule

References

Ottawa Rough Riders seasons
1954 Canadian football season by team